J. Allen Boone (17 February 1882 – 17 June 1965) was an American author of several books about nonverbal communication with animals in the 1940s and 1950s.  He wrote much on his friendship with Strongheart, a film star-German shepherd, who he credits with teaching him how to achieve deeper bonds through extrasensory perception, a "silent language" that can be learned.

Boone was an early film producer and correspondent for the Washington Post.  His friendships in Hollywood led to his care-taking of Strongheart.

Works
Letters to Strongheart (Prentice Hall, 1939; Robert H Sommer, 1977, ; Tree of Life Publications, 1999)
You are the adventure! (Prentice-Hall, 1943; Robert H Sommer, 1977)
Kinship with All Life (Harper and Row, 1954; HarperCollins, 1976)
Language of Silence: Heartwarming True Experiences That Reveal a Wonderful World of Communication Between Human Beings and Animals edited by Paul and Blanche Leonard, (Harpercollins, 1970, ; Harper & Row, 1976), republished, with editing by Bianca Leonardo, as Adventures in Kinship with All Life (Tree of Life Publications, 1990, ; 3rd edition, 1990)

References

External links

1882 births
1965 deaths
20th-century American male writers
American animal care and training writers
American male non-fiction writers
Animal cognition writers